Firewheel Town Center is a  open-air regional shopping mall in Garland, Texas. The mall is located on the northeast corner of President George Bush Turnpike and State Highway 78. The mall opened on October 7, 2005. Although "coming soon" signs first appeared in 1984, actual construction did not begin until early 2003. It was completed in 2005 and is owned by the Simon Property Group. Unlike a traditional mall, Firewheel Town Center was designed in the new urbanism style. Similar area shopping centers include Southlake Town Square, The Shops at Legacy, Uptown Village at Cedar Hill, The Shops at Highland Village, and The Village at Allen.

The Firewheel name comes from the nearby Firewheel Golf Park, which in turn is named for a flower that grows naturally in the area.

Dillard's, Macy's (originally Foley's), DSW Shoe Warehouse, Dick's Sporting Goods, Barnes & Noble, Men's Wearhouse, Old Navy, Kirkland's, Ulta, and AMC Theatres are the mall's major stores.

Dining options at Firewheel include: Bar Louie, Fish City Grill, Genghis Grill, Gloria's Mexican Restaurant, Houlihan's, Pete's Burgers Wings & Drinks, Razzoo's Cajun Cafe, and T.G.I Friday's.

See also 
List of shopping malls in the Dallas/Fort Worth Metroplex

References

External links
Official website

Simon Property Group
Shopping malls in the Dallas–Fort Worth metroplex
Shopping malls established in 2005
David M. Schwarz buildings
New Classical architecture
New Urbanism communities